The Reform Movement for Social Development (Mouvement de la réforme pour le développement social) is a political party in Senegal. 
At the legislative elections of 3 June 2007, the party won 1.16% of the popular vote and 1 out of 150 seats.

References

Political parties in Senegal